Todagin South Slope Provincial Park is a provincial park in British Columbia, Canada, located on the west side of Todagin Creek to the east of Kinaskan Lake in the Stikine Country, to the south of the community of Dease Lake. Created in 2001, it contains c. 3557 ha.

References

Stikine Country
Provincial parks of British Columbia
Protected areas established in 2001
2001 establishments in British Columbia